XHEL-FM is a radio station on 95.1 FM in Fresnillo, Zacatecas, known as La Ele FM.

History
XEEL-AM 610 received its concession on January 31, 1959. It was owned by José Antonio Casas Torres and broadcast with 1,000 watts day and 150 watts night. By the late 1960s, control was in the hands of José Antonio Casas García. On July 26, 2003, Casas García died; Juana Gallegos Rojas became the concessionaire. She has also since died.

XEEL was cleared to move to FM in February 2011, with its tower on Cerro Xoconostle. In 2015, XHEL-FM was approved to increase power to 33.22 kW.

References

Radio stations in Zacatecas
Radio stations established in 1959